Matt Weaver (born 28 May 1985) is an Australian cricketer. He played in three List A matches for South Australia in 2013.

See also
 List of South Australian representative cricketers

References

External links
 

1985 births
Living people
Australian cricketers
South Australia cricketers
Cricketers from Adelaide